William A. Prout was a Liberian politician.

Prout was the son of Jacob W. Prout, who served as secretary of the Liberian Constitutional Convention. Prout served as the first elected Governor of Republic of Maryland after the country achieved independence. In April 1856, Prout was removed from office for repeated public drunkenness.

References

Year of birth missing
Year of death missing
People from Maryland County
Governors of the Republic of Maryland
19th-century Liberian politicians